The One-Hundredth Wisconsin Legislature convened, in regular session, on January 3, 2011, and concluded on May 22, 2012. A concurrent special session was begun on January 18, 2011, and ran through May 11, 2011, and another brief special session was held from October 25, 2011, through November 3, 2011. There was an additional extraordinary session held from June 14, 2011, through August 1, 2011.

Senators representing odd-numbered districts were newly elected for this session and were serving the first two years of a four-year term. Assembly members were elected to a two-year term. Assembly members and odd-numbered senators were elected in the general election of November 2, 2010. Senators representing even-numbered districts were serving the third and fourth year of their four-year term, having been elected in the general election held on November 4, 2008.

During this session, recall elections were held in 2011 and 2012 in which 13 senators were challenged. Three were eventually removed from office and one other resigned, but was replaced by a senator of the same party.

Major events

 January 3, 2011: Inauguration of Scott Walker as 45th Governor of Wisconsin.
 February 14, 2011: Major protests began at the Wisconsin State Capitol over the proposed "Budget Repair" Bill.
 February 17, 2011: 14 Democratic senators fled the state to deny the senate a quorum and prevent passage of the Budget Repair Bill.
 March 9, 2011: Senate Republicans amended the Budget Repair Bill to remove budgetary items, allowing it to pass without a quorum.
 July 19, 2011: Senator Dave Hansen survived a recall election.
 August 9, 2011: Senators Randy Hopper and Dan Kapanke were defeated in recall elections, they were replaced by Jessica King and Jennifer Shilling, respectively.  Senators Robert Cowles, Alberta Darling, Sheila Harsdorf, and Luther Olsen survived recall elections.
 August 16, 2011: Senators Jim Holperin and Robert Wirch survived recall elections.
 March 16, 2012: Pam Galloway resigned from the Wisconsin Senate.
 June 5, 2012: Governor Scott Walker survived a recall election.  Senator Van H. Wanggaard was defeated in a recall election and was replaced by John Lehman.  Senators Scott L. Fitzgerald and Terry Moulton survived recall elections. Jerry Petrowski elected to the Senate in a special election.

Major legislation

 March 11, 2011: Act relating to state finances, collective bargaining for public employees, compensation and fringe benefits of public employees, the state civil service system, the Medical Assistance program, 2011 Act 10.  The controversial Budget Repair Bill which removed collective bargaining rights from state employees, prompted months of protests at the state capitol, and ultimately led to recall elections for thirteen senators and Governor Scott Walker.
 August 9, 2011: Act relating to legislative redistricting, 2011 Act 43. An overhaul of Wisconsin legislative voting districts fortified the Republican majorities through gerrymandering.

Party summary

Senate summary

Assembly summary

Sessions
 2011-2012 regular session: January 3, 2011 – May 22, 2012
 January 2011 special session: January 18, 2011 – May 11, 2011
 Extraordinary session: June 14, 2011 – August 1, 2011
 September 2011 special session: October 25, 2011 – November 3, 2011

Leaders
 Legislative Leadership for 2011-12 
 Wisconsin

Senate leadership
President of the Senate: Sen. Fred Risser
President pro tempore: Sen. Tim Carpenter
Chief Clerk: Hon. Robert J. Marchant
Sergeant at arms: Hon. Edward Blazel

Assembly leadership
Speaker of the Assembly: Rep. Jeff Fitzgerald
Speaker pro tempore: Rep. Bill Kramer
Chief clerk: Hon. Patrick E. Fuller
Sergeant at arms: Hon. Anne Tonnon Byers

Members

Members of the Senate

†  Elected in a recall election (2011, 2012)

Members of the Assembly

Changes from the 99th Legislature

Open seats
On April 14, 2011, Joe Parisi resigned from the 48th District after being elected Dane County Executive.

Notes

References

100
2011 in Wisconsin
2012 in Wisconsin
2011 U.S. legislative sessions
2012 U.S. legislative sessions